Rok River (Swedish: Rokån) is a river in Sweden.

References

Rivers of Norrbotten County